Rafał Zawierucha (born 12 October 1986) is a Polish film and theatre actor, best known for his role of Roman Polanski in the 2019 Quentin Tarantino film Once Upon a Time in Hollywood.

Life and career 
Zawierucha was born in Kraków. He grew up in Kielce where he has finished high school. In 2012, Zawierucha graduated Aleksander Zelwerowicz National Academy of Dramatic Art in Warsaw.

He has appeared in Polish movies, including Gods (Bogowie), Jack Strong and Warsaw 44 (Miasto 44), and in TV series like Recipe For Life and Siła wyższa. In 2012, he received a Golden Duck nomination for his role in  Andrzej Barański's Księstwo.

In 2019, Zawierucha played director Roman Polanski in Once Upon a Time in Hollywood, a film by Quentin Tarantino that takes place at the time of the 1969 Tate-LaBianca murders.

Selected filmography

See also
Cinema of Poland

References

External links
 
 Rafał Zawierucha at Filmweb.pl 

Living people
1986 births
Male actors from Kraków
Polish male film actors
Polish male stage actors
21st-century Polish male actors
Aleksander Zelwerowicz National Academy of Dramatic Art in Warsaw alumni